The Influencers Dinner is a secret dining experience started in New York in 2009 by behavior scientist and social engineer Jon Levy.  Twelve thought leaders, tastemakers, and influencers from various industries attend each dinner. During the course of the experience they are not allowed to discuss their professional career, or share their last name. The dinner has a community design where Jon guides all attendees through the preparation of the meal. Once seated and eating guests take turns guessing what their fellow attendees do professionally.

Dinner structure 

The Influencers Dinner is known for being highly structured.
 The guest list is kept secret.
 Guests do not know one another beforehand.
 Guests are asked not to discuss their work or achievements.
 All attendees help prepare a simple meal where no cooking experience is necessary. 
 Once seated at the dinner table, all attendees take turns guessing what fellow guest's professions.
 After dinner the salon begins. During this portion musicians, comedians, and magicians perform, or speakers present ideas.

Attendees 

The guests have ranged from entertainment stars, athletes, scientists, business leaders, artists, and royalty.

Although membership is kept secret several participants have been public about their attendance these include: Cameron Winklevoss, Andre Royo, Tamsen Fadal, Bill Phillips, Dan King, Anton Fig. Matt Pinfield, Andy Frankenberger,  Esther Dyson, Cindy Gallop have also attended past dinners.

References

External links 

 

Cuisine of New York City
Secret societies in the United States